The Encyclopédie française was a French encyclopedia designed by Anatole de Monzie and Lucien Febvre. It appeared between 1935 and 1966.

Volumes

I. L'Outillage mental. Pensée, langage, mathématique.
II. La physique.
III. Le Ciel et la Terre.
IV. La vie.
V. Les êtres vivants.
VI. L'être humain.
VII. Espèce humaine.
VIII. La vie mentale.
IX. L'univers économique et social.
X. L'état moderne, aménagement et crise.
XI. La vie internationale.
XII. Chimie. Science et industries.
XIII. Industrie. Agriculture.
XIV. La civilisation quotidienne.
XV. Education et instruction.
XVI. Arts et Littératures dans la société contemporaine: Materiaux et Techniques.
XVII. Arts et Littératures dans la société contemporaine: Oeuvres et Interprétations.
XVIII. La Civilisation écrite.
XIX. Philosophie. Religion.
XX. Le monde en devenir (histoire, évolution, prospective).

External links
Charles Van Doren, "The Idea of an Encyclopedia" (1963), discussing the Encyclopédie française: 1, 2, 3, 4, 5, 6

French encyclopedias
20th-century encyclopedias